Bangarada Gudi is a 1976 Indian Kannada film, directed by K. S. R. Das and produced by C. H. Prakash Rao. The film stars Vishnuvardhan, Manjula, Ambareesh and Padmapriya in the lead roles. The film has musical score by G. K. Venkatesh. The director remade the movie in Telugu in 1979 as Bangaru Gudi.

Cast

Vishnuvardhan
Manjula
Ambareesh
Padmapriya (actress)
Vajramuni
Shivaram
K. S. Ashwath
Gangadhar
Prabhakar
Chethan Ramarao
Leelavathi
Baby Indira

Soundtrack
All the songs are composed and scored by G. K. Venkatesh and written by Chi. Udayashankar.

References

External links
 
 

1976 films
1970s Kannada-language films
Films directed by K. S. R. Das
Films scored by G. K. Venkatesh
Kannada films remade in other languages